La Merced (Catamarca) is a village and municipality in Catamarca Province in northwestern Argentina. It is the government seat of the Paclín Department.

References

Populated places in Catamarca Province